Inge Schell (born 9 June 1939) is a German hurdler. She competed in the women's 80 metres hurdles at the 1968 Summer Olympics, representing West Germany.

References

External links
 

1939 births
Living people
Athletes (track and field) at the 1968 Summer Olympics
German female hurdlers
Olympic athletes of West Germany
People from Munich (district)
Sportspeople from Upper Bavaria